Le Macaron is a bakery chain in the United States selling macarons made of meringue with ganache filling in various flavors and colors, including Sicilian pistachio and black currant, and other confections.  It was founded in 2009 by a French mother-daughter duo, Rosalie and Audrey Guillem, who opened their first store in Sarasota, Florida and subsequently expanded nationwide via franchises and corporate-owned locations.  By 2019 they had more than fifty stores.

References

External links
Le Macaron company website

Bakeries of the United States
French pastries